The 2017–18 ISU World Standings and Season's World Ranking, are the World Standings and Season's World Ranking published by the International Skating Union (ISU) during the 2017–18 season.

The 2017–18 ISU Season's World Ranking is based on the results of the 2017–18 season only, for single & pair skating and ice dance.

Season's World Ranking 
The remainder of this section is a complete list, by discipline, published by the ISU.

Men's singles (149 skaters)

Ladies' singles (157 skaters)

See also 
 ISU World Standings and Season's World Ranking
 2017–18 ISU World Standings
 List of highest ranked figure skaters by nation
 List of ISU World Standings and Season's World Ranking statistics
 2017–18 figure skating season
 2017–18 synchronized skating season

References

External links 
 International Skating Union
 ISU World standings for Single & Pair Skating and Ice Dance / ISU Season's World Ranking
 ISU World standings for Synchronized Skating

ISU World Standings and Season's World Ranking
Standings and Ranking
Standings and Ranking